Lesaka Technologies (formerly Net 1 UEPS Technologies) is a publicly-traded South-African financial technology company that is listed on the NASDAQ (Nasdaq: UEPS) and Johannesburg Stock Exchange (JSE: NT1). The company has managed Botswana and South Africa's social grant payment system. The company is headquartered in Johannesburg. By July 2012, Net1 had issued more than 2.5 million South African Social Security Agency (SASSA) debit MasterCards to social grant recipients in the country.

History 
It was founded by Serge Belamant who also developed its basic technology. He left the company in 2017 under a "separation agreement" filed with the Securities and Exchange Commission for $8 million. Herman Kotze, the company's chief financial officer, became its CEO after Belamant's departure.

Acquisitions
In 2010, the company announced that it would acquire KSNet, a Korean payment processor, for $233 million. Net1 expanded into the United Kingdom with the acquisition of Zazoo in 2015. It reached an agreement with MobiKwik, a mobile phone based payment system and digital wallet based in India, in 2016.

Net1 sold KSNet to Stonebridge Capital and Payletter for $237 million in March 2020. In September 2020, Cash Paymaster Services (CPS), a subsidiary of Net1, went into liquidation. It had been in a previous legal dispute over deductions from grant payments for micro loans‚ airtime and other financial services.

In March 2022 Net1's R3.7 billion 100% acquisition of the Connect Group was approved by the South African Competition authorities. Connect Group, which was founded in 2006, is one of the leading providers of fintech solutions in the country and services nearly 44 000 micro, small and medium enterprises in Southern Africa. The transaction was first announced in November last year, when Net1 signed a definitive agreement to acquire 100% of the Connect Group

References

External links 

 

Financial technology companies
Technology companies of South Africa
Finance in South Africa
Companies based in Johannesburg
Companies listed on the Johannesburg Stock Exchange